EBNewsDaily is an english-language online newspaper published in South Africa by Hashdon Media. It features articles in the fields of current affairs politics, foreign affairs, business and the economy, culture, law, technology, sports, and science.

See also 

 Azhizhi
 Botswana Guardian
 BusinessTech
 Daily Maverick
 Daily News Botswana
 News24

References

External Links 

 

English-language newspapers published in Africa
Online newspapers published in South Africa